Epaphius rubens is a species of beetle in the family Carabidae.

Description
The upper body is reddish brown. That is common from eastern North America to Europe, Siberia.

Ecology
Epaphius rubens lives under stones in rocky seaside environment.

References

Beetles described in 1792